Jasienica Rosielna  is a village in Brzozów County, Subcarpathian Voivodeship, in south-eastern Poland. It is the seat of the gmina (administrative district) called Gmina Jasienica Rosielna.

The village has a population of 2,100.

History

As a result of the first of Partitions of Poland (Treaty of St-Petersburg dated 5 July 1772, Jasienica (and the Galicia) was attributed to the Habsburg Monarchy. It was part of the Bezirkshauptmannschaft Brzozow (Brzozów County).

For more details, see the article Kingdom of Galicia and Lodomeria.

References

Villages in Brzozów County